Nur ad-Din Masalha (born 4 January 1957) commonly known in English as Nur Masalha is a Palestinian writer and academic.

He is a historian of Palestine and formerly professor of religion and politics and director of the Centre for Religion and History and the Holy Land Research Project at St. Mary's University. He was also programme director of the MA in religion, Politics and Conflict Resolution at St Mary's University (2005–2015).

He is currently member of the Centre for Palestine Studies, London Middle East Institute, School of Oriental and African Studies, University of London. He is also currently member of the Centre for the Philosophy of History, St. Mary's University.

He was professorial research associate, Department of History, SOAS (University of London), 2009–2015. He was also a member of the Kuwait Programme, Department of Government, London School of Economics (monograph, with Stephanie Cronin, on ‘The Islamic Republic of Iran and the GCC States: From Revolution to Realpolitik?).

He is also the editor of Journal of Holy Land and Palestine Studies (formerly Holy Land Studies: A Multidisciplinary Journal), published by Edinburgh University Press, and the author of many books on Palestine-Israel, including  Theologies of Liberation in Palestine-Israel: Indigenous, Contextual, and Postcolonial Perspectives (2014), The Zionist Bible: Biblical Precedent, Colonialism and the Erasure of Memory (2013), The Palestine Nakba: Decolonising History, Narrating the Subaltern, Reclaiming Memory (January 2012), The Bible and Zionism: Invented Traditions, Archaeology and Post-Colonialism in Palestine-Israel (2007), Catastrophe Remembered (2005), A Land Without a People (1997), Expulsion of the Palestinians: The Concept of "Transfer" in Zionist Political Thought, 1882–1948 (1992), Imperial Israel and the Palestinians: The Politics of Expansion (2000) and The Politics of Denial: Israel and the Palestinian Refugee Problem (2003). Nur Masalha also sits on the editorial board of Janus Unbound: Journal of Critical Studies whose inaugural issue on Palestine he describes as a "major achievement."

Masalha has also served as an honorary fellow in the Centre for Middle Eastern and Islamic Studies, Durham University; research associate in the Department of Law at the School of Oriental and African Studies; and has taught at Birzeit University in Ramallah, West Bank.

Masalha is also the historian commentator in the award–winning, documentary film La Terre Parle Arabe [the Land Speaks Arabic] (2007), directed by Maryse Gargour, which tells the story of the background and build-up to the expulsion and flight of the Palestinian Arabs in 1948 from the newly created State of Israel.

Education
Masalha studied as an undergraduate and a postgraduate at the Hebrew University in Jerusalem. He obtained a PhD in politics from the School of Oriental and African Studies, University of London.

Journal of Holy Land and Palestine Studies (formerly Holy Land Studies: A Multidisciplinary Journal)
Masalha is co-founder and editor of Journal of Holy Land and Palestine Studies formerly Holy Land Studies: A Multidisciplinary Journal, a fully refereed journal published by Edinburgh University Press. A Spanish-language edition, Estudios de Tierra Santa: Una Revista Multidisciplinaria, is published by Editorial Canaán, Buenos Aires, and Faculty of Philosophy and Letters, University of Buenos Aires, Argentina.

The journal was co-founded with Michael Prior in 2002. Members of the editorial board and International Advisory Board included the late Edward W. Said, Hisham Sharabi and Samih Farsoun. Current members include Noam Chomsky, Ilan Pappe, Yaser Suleiman, Stephanie Cronin, Tim Niblock, Dan Rabinowitz, Naseer Aruri, As’ad Ghanem, Naim Ateek, Donald Wagner, Ismael Abu-Saad, Oren Yiftachel, William Dalrymple, Salim Tamari, Rosemary Radford Ruether and Thomas L. Thompson.

Critique of Benny Morris
Alongside Norman Finkelstein, Masalha has been critical of Benny Morris's first publication on the 1948 Palestinian exodus: The Birth of the Palestinian Refugee Problem (1988). Masalha argues that Morris's conclusions have a pro-Israeli bias, in that:
 Morris did not fully acknowledge that his work rests largely on selectively released Israeli documentation, while the most sensitive documents remain closed to researchers.
 Morris treated the evidence in the Israeli documents in an uncritical way, and did not take into account that they are, at times, apologetics.
 Morris minimized the number of expulsions: Finkelstein asserts that in the table in which Morris summarizes causes of abandonment, village by village, many cases of "military assault on settlement (M)" should have been "expulsions (E)".
 Morris's conclusions were skewed with respect to the evidence he himself presents, and when the conclusions are harsh for the Israelis he tended to give them a less incriminating spin.
Both Finkelstein and Masalha prefer the central conclusion that there was a transfer policy.

In a reply to Finkelstein and Masalha, Morris answers he "saw enough material, military and civilian, to obtain an accurate picture of what happened," that Finkelstein and Masalha draw their conclusions with a pro-Palestinian bias, and that with regard to the distinction between military assault and expulsion they should accept that he uses a "more narrow and severe" definition of expulsions. Morris holds to his central conclusion that there was no transfer policy.

Academic qualifications 

1979: BA in international relations and politics, Hebrew University, Jerusalem
1982: MA in Middle East politics, Hebrew University, Jerusalem
1988: PhD in Middle Eastern politics, School of Oriental and African Studies, University of London.

Posts held 
 1985-86: SOAS (University of London), part-time lecturer in Middle East politics
 1988-93: Constantine Zureik Research Fellow, Institute for Palestine Studies, Washington DC
 1994-95: assistant professor of the modern history of the Middle East, Birzeit University, Palestine
 1997-2000: part-time lecturer, Richmond-The American International University in London
 2000: visiting lecturer, St Mary's University College (University of Surrey)
 2001-2002: research fellow, St Mary's University College (University of Surrey)
 January 2001-November 2015: director of Holy Land Research Project, St Mary's University
 2002-2006: senior lecturer, St Mary's University College (University of Surrey)
 2005-November 2015: director of MA Programme in Religion, Politics and Conflict Resolution, St Mary's University
 2006-2009: reader in religion and politics, School of Theology, Philosophy and History, St Mary's University College (University of Surrey)
 2009-November 2015: professor of religion and politics, School of Arts and Humanities, St Mary's University
 January 2007-November 2015: director of the Centre for Religion and History, School of Arts and Humanities, St Mary's University

Books in English, Spanish and Arabic 

 Palestine: A Four Thousand Year History. (Zed Books Ltd, 2020), 448pp. 
 Theologies of Liberation in Palestine-Israel: Indigenous, Contextual, and Postcolonial Perspectives. (Pickwick Publications, 2014).248pp. 
 The Zionist Bible: Biblical Precedent, Colonialism and the Erasure of Memory (London: Acumen, 2013),295pp.   
 The Palestine Nakba: Decolonising History, Narrating the Subaltern, Reclaiming Memory (London: Zed Books, 2012), 288pp.  
 (ed. with Saad Chedid), La Biblia leída con los ojos de los Cananeos: [Reading the Bible with the Eyes of the Canaanites]: Recordano an Edward W. Said (Bones Aires: Editorial Canaán, 2011), 241 pp.
 La Biblia y el sionismo: Invención de una tradición y discurso poscolonial (Barcelona: Edicions Bellaterra, 2008),440pp.
 La Expulsión De Los Palestinos: El concepto de "transferencia" en el pensamiento político sionista, 1882-1948 (Madrid: Bósforo Libros 2008); La Expulsión De Los Palestinos (Buenos Aires: Editorial Canaán, 2008), 265pp.
 The Bible and Zionism: Invented Traditions, Archaeology and Post-colonialism in Palestine-Israel (2007) (London: Zed Books) 
 Catastrophe Remembered: Palestine, Israel and the Internal Refugees: Essays in Memory of Edward W. Said (2005) (London: Zed Books) 
 Politicas De La Negación: Israel Y Los Refugiados Palestininos (2005) (Barcelona: Edicions Bellaterra), 350 pp.
 The Politics of Denial: Israel and the Palestinian Refugee Problem (2003) (London: Pluto Press) 
 Israeel wa-Siyasat al-Nafi (2003) (Ramallah, Palestine: Madar-the Palestinian Centre for Israeli Studies, [Arabic]), 320 pp.
 Teorias De La Expansion Territorial (2002) (Barcelona: Edicions Bellaterra), 321 pp.
 Israeel al-Kubra wal-Filistiniyyun: Siyasat al-Tawasu' (2001) (Beirut: Institute for Palestine Studies, [Arabic]), 399 pp.
 Imperial Israel and the Palestinians: The Politics of Expansion (2000) (London: Pluto Press) 
 A land without a people (1997) (London: Faber and Faber) 
 Ard Akthar wa-Arab Akal (1997) (Beirut: Institute for Palestine Studies, [Arabic]), 331 pp.
 The Palestinians in Israel: Is Israel the State of All its Citizens and Absentees? (1993) The (Haifa: Galilee Centre for Social Research)
 Expulsion of the Palestinians: The Concept of "Transfer" in Zionist Political Thought (1992) (Washington DC: Institute for Palestine Studies) 
 Tard al-Flistiniyyun (1992) (Beirut: Institute for Palestine Studies, [Arabic]), 293 pp.

Articles and chapters in books
 'On Recent Hebrew and Israeli Sources for the Palestinian Exodus, 1947-1949', Journal of Palestine Studies (Autumn 1988), pp. 121–137.
 'Israeli Revisionist Historiography of the Birth of Israel and its Palestinian Exodus', Scandinavian Journal of Development Alternatives (March 1990), pp. 71–97.
 'Faysal's Pan-Arabism, 1921-1933', Middle Eastern Studies (October 1991), pp. 679–693.
 'Debate on the 1948 Exodus: A Critique of Benny Morris', Journal of Palestine Studies (Autumn 1991), pp. 90–97.
 'Operation Hafarferet and the Massacre of Kafr Qassem, October 1956', The Arab Review (Summer 1994), pp. 15–21.
 'Sovereignty over Jerusalem: The Status of the City under International Law', Middle East International, 6 January 1995, pp. 17–18.
 'Who Rules Jerusalem?' Index on Censorship (September–October 1995), pp. 163–166.
 'The 1956-57 Occupation of the Gaza Strip: Israeli Plans to Resettle the Palestinian Refugees', British Journal of Middle Eastern Studies 23, No.1 (1996), pp. 55–68.
 'A Different Peace', Index on Censorship (May–June 1996), pp. 18–21.
 Yosef Weitz and Operation Yohanan, 1949–1953, Occasional Paper no.55, Centre for Middle Eastern and Islamic Studies, University of Durham, August 1996, 31 pp.
 '1967: Why Did the Palestinians Leave?' Shaml (Ramallah, West Bank, July 1997), pp. 2–5.
 'Transfer', in Philip Mattar (ed.), Encyclopedia of the Palestinians (New York: Facts on File, 2000), pp. 401–404.
 'The 1967 Palestinian Exodus', in Ghada Karmi and Eugene Cotran (eds.), The Palestinian Exodus, 1948-1998 (Reading: Ithaca Press, 1999), pp. 63–109.
 'A Galilee Without Christians?' in Anthony O'Mahony (ed.), Palestinian Christians: Religion, Politics and Society in the Holy Land (London: Melisende, 1999), pp. 190–222.
 'The Historical Roots of the Palestinian Refugee Question', in Naseer Aruri (ed.), The Palestinian Refugees: The Right of Return (London: Pluto Press, July 2001), pp. 36–67.
 Ariel Sharon: A Political Profile, Occasional Paper (London: Council for the Advancement of Arab-British Understanding, 2001).
 'The PLO, Resolution 194 and the 'right of return': Evolving Palestinian attitudes towards the refugee question from the 1948 Nakba to the Camp David summit of July 2002', Eugene Cotran (ed.), Yearbook of Islamic and Middle Eastern Law 7 (2002), pp. 127–155.
 'Reinventing Maimonides: From Universalist Philosopher to Religious Fundamentalist (1967-2002)', Holy Land Studies: A Multidisciplinary Journal, Vol.1, No.1 (September 2002), pp. 85–117.
 'Le Concept De 'Transfer' Dans La Doctrine Et Dans La Pratique Du Mouvement Sioniste', in Farouk Mardam-Bey and Elias Sanbar (eds.), LE DROIT AU RETOUR: LE PROBLEME DES REFUGIES PALESTINIENS (Sindbad, Paris, 2002), pp. 15–59.
 'Israel and the Palestinian Refugees', La Vanguardia (Barcelona), (July 2002).
 'The Palestinian Nakba', Global Dialogue (Nicosia, Cyprus), Vol.4, No.3 (Summer 2002), pp. 77–91.
 'La responsabilita morale di Israele verso rifugiati palestinesti', Afriche e Orienti (Italy), Vol. 4, No.3 (2002), pp. 106–109.
 'From Propaganda to Scholarship: Dr Joseph Schechtman and the Origins of the Israeli Polemics on the Palestinian Refugees', Holy Land Studies: A Multidisciplinary Journal, Vol.2, No.2 (March 2002), pp. 188–197.
 'La importancia historica de la comunidad palestinin en libano', Vanguardia Dossier (Barcelona), No. 8 (October/December 2003), pp. 55–60.
 'Sectarianism and the Rejection of Tawteen: Lebanon and the Palestinian Refugees', in Eugene Cotran and Martin Lau (eds.), Yearbook of Islamic and Middle Eastern Law (Leiden: Brill Academic Publishers, 2004), pp. 110–130.
 Dissolvere il problema dei rifugiati palestinesi: Proposte israeliene di 'reinsediamento' (1948-1957)', in Jamil Hilal and Ilan Pappe (eds.), Parlare co il Nemico: Narrazioni Palestinesi e Israeliane a Confronto [Talking to the Enemy: Palestinian and Israeli Narratives], (Torino: Bollati Boringghieri editore, 2004), pp. 169–215.
 'Edward W. Said and Rethinking the Question of Palestine', The Arab World Geographer (University of Akron, US), Vol. 17 (Spring/Summer 2004), pp. 4–21.
 'Jewish Fundamentalism and the 'Sacred Geography' of Jerusalem in Comparative Perspective (1967-2004): Implications for Inter-faith Relations', Holy Land Studies: A Multidisciplinary Journal, Vol.3, No.1 (May 2004), pp. 29–67.
 'Prólogo: Leyendo la Biblia con los ojos de los cananeos, En homenaje al professor Michael Prior', in Michael Prior, La Biblia y el colonialismo: Una critica moral [The Bible and Colonialism: A Moral Critique] (Buenos Aires: Editorial Canaan, 2005), pp.xi-xxiv.
 'A Comparative Study of Jewish, Christian and Islamic Fundamentalist Perspectives on Jerusalem: Implications for Inter-faith Relations', Holy Land Studies: A Multidisciplinary Journal, Vol.5, No.1 (May 2006), pp. 97–112.
 ‘Die Nakba, Die Katasrophe von 1948’, INAMO (Informationsprojekt Naher und Mittlerer Osten) (Berlin) 54 (Summer 2008), pp. 4–7.
 ‘Remembering the Palestinian Nakba: Commemoration, Oral History and Narratives of Memory', Holy Land Studies: A Multidisciplinary Journal, Vol.7, No.2 (November 2008), pp.123-156.
 'Jérusalem, la ferveur et la guerre: Le Droit international,’ Qantara (magazine des cultures arabe et méditerranéenne, Institut du Monde Arabe, Paris), No. 73 (Automne 2009), pp. 40–42.
 'Di/solving the Palestinian Refugee Problem: Israeli Resettlement Plans in the First Decade of the State’, in Ilan Pappe and Jamīl Hilal (ed.) Across the Wall: Narratives of Israeli-Palestinian History (I.B Tauris, 2010), pp. 107–155.
 'Reading the Bible with the Eyes of the Canaanites: Neo-Zionism, Political Theology and the Land Traditions of the Bible (1967 to Gaza 2009)', Holy Land Studies: A Multidisciplinary Journal, Vol. 8, No.1 (May 2009), pp. 55–108.
 'Collective Memory, Indigenous Resistance and the Struggle for Return: Palestinians inside Israel Six Decades after the Nakba’, Jadal, (Mada Al-Carmel-Arab Center for Applied Social Research, Haifa), No.3 May 2009).
 'New History, Post-Zionism and Neo-Colonialism: A Critique of the Israeli “New Historians”’, Holy Land Studies: A Multidisciplinary Journal, Vol. 10, No.1 (May 2011), pp. 1-53.
'Edward W. Said: El sionismo y la visión democrática laica’, in Saad Chedid and Nur Masalha (eds.) La Biblia leída con los ojos de los cananeos: Recordando an Edward W. Said (Buenos Aires: Editorial Canaán, 2011), pp. 135–184.
 'Liberating Methodologies and Nakba Studies: Palestinian History and Memory from below as Sites of Lifelong Learning', Holy Land Studies: A Multidisciplinary Journal, Vol. 13, No. 1 (May 2014). pp. 25–69.
 'Settler-Colonialism, Memoricide and Indigenous Toponymic Memory: The Appropriation of Palestinian Place Names by the Israeli State', Journal of Holy Land and Palestine Studies, Vol. 14 Issue 1 (May 2015), pp. 3–57.
 'The Concept of Palestine: The Conception of Palestine from the Late Bronze Age to the Modern Period', Journal of Holy Land and Palestine Studies, Vol. 15, Issue 2 (November 2016), pp. 143–202.

See also

1948 Palestinian exodus
Palestinian refugee

References

External links
 Institute of Palestinian studies Critique of Benny Morris
 Institute of Palestinian studies "On Recent Hebrew and Israeli Sources for the Palestinian Exodus, 1947-49" in 18, no. 1 (Aut. 88): 121–37.
  Edinburgh University Press Holy Land Studies
 Editorial Canaán Holy Land Studies/Estudios de Tierra Santa
 Holy Land Studies: A Multidisciplinary Journal

1957 births
Living people
20th-century Palestinian historians
Historians of the Middle East
Academic staff of Birzeit University
Hebrew University of Jerusalem alumni
Academics of the University of Surrey
Academics of SOAS University of London
Academics of Durham University
Alumni of SOAS University of London
21st-century Palestinian historians